José Luis Carreira (born 30 March 1962) is a retired Spanish middle-distance runner who competed primarily in the 1500 metres. He won medals at the 1985 and 1986 European Indoor Championships. In addition, he finished sixth at the 1989 World Indoor Championships and ninth at the 1986 European Championships.

International competitions

Personal bests
Outdoor
800 metres – 1:52.06 (Utrecht 1981)
1500 metres – 3:35.56 (A Coruña 1986)
One mile – 3:55.94 (Madrid 1987)
2000 metres – 4:57.53 (Santander 1986)
3000 metres – 7:44.04 (Seville 1987)
5000 metres – 13:25.94 (Barcelona 1989)
Indoor
1500 metres – 3:38.77 (Oviedo 1986)
3000 metres – 7:51.98 (Budapest 1989)

References

All-Athletics profile

1962 births
Living people
Spanish male middle-distance runners
Athletes from Madrid
20th-century Spanish people
21st-century Spanish people